Danny Craven (born 21 November 1991) is a rugby league footballer who plays as a  or  for the Widnes Vikings in the Betfred Championship.

Background
Craven was born in St Helens, Merseyside, England.

Career
He made his début against Whitehaven in 2010.
Rejoined Widnes for the 2021 season.

References

External links
Widnes Vikings profile
SL profile

1991 births
Living people
English rugby league players
Featherstone Rovers players
Halifax R.L.F.C. players
Rugby league fullbacks
Rugby league players from St Helens, Merseyside
Whitehaven R.L.F.C. players
Widnes Vikings players
Workington Town players